Flandria was a Belgian professional cycling team that existed from 1957 to 1979. It was sponsored by Flandria a bicycle manufacturer located in West Flanders that also manufactures mopeds, lawnmowers, and motorbikes.

History 
Started with a team built around Joseph Planckaert, and Rik Van Looy. Youngsters Eddy Merckx, Peter Post, Herman Van Springel, and Walter Godefroot all joined at early stages of their career, although some such as Merckx left soon after to become leader of his own team.

After Van Looy's retirement, Belgian Freddy Maertens took over the leadership mantle, famous for his rivalry with Eddy Merckx. Irishman Sean Kelly also started his professional career with Flandria, as Maertens' super-domestique.

Joop Zoetemelk rode for the team from 1970-1972 finishing on the podium twice in the Tour de France during this span. He also finished 5th in the 1972 Tour de France and won the King of the Mountains classification in the 1971 Vuelta a España.

Roster 
Roster in 1975:

References

Further reading

External links

Cycling teams based in Belgium
Cycling teams established in 1957
Cycling teams disestablished in 1979
Defunct cycling teams based in Belgium